Blonde Poison is a 1919 German silent drama film directed by Hubert Moest and starring Hedda Vernon, Paul Hartmann, and Olga Engl.

The film's sets were designed by the art director Karl Machus.

Cast

References

Bibliography

External links

1919 films
Films of the Weimar Republic
German silent feature films
Films directed by Hubert Moest
German drama films
1919 drama films
German black-and-white films
Silent drama films
1910s German films
1910s German-language films